In mathematics, an abstract differential equation is a differential equation in which the unknown function and its derivatives take values in some generic abstract space (a Hilbert space, a Banach space, etc.). Equations of this kind arise e.g. in the study of partial differential equations: if to one of the variables is given a privileged position (e.g. time, in heat or wave equations) and all the others are put together, an ordinary "differential" equation with respect to the variable which was put in evidence is obtained. Adding boundary conditions can often be translated in terms of considering solutions in some convenient function spaces.

The classical abstract differential equation which is most frequently encountered is the equation 

An exhaustive treatment of the homogeneous case with a constant operator is given by the theory of C0-semigroups. Very often, the study of other abstract differential equations amounts (by e.g. reduction to a set of equations of the first order) to the study of this equation.

The theory of abstract differential equations has been founded by Einar Hille in several papers and in his book Functional Analysis and Semi-Groups. Other main contributors were Kōsaku Yosida, Ralph Phillips, Isao Miyadera, and Selim Grigorievich Krein.

Abstract Cauchy problem

Definition
A function  is said to have strong derivative (or to be Frechet differentiable or simply differentiable) at the point  if there exists an element  such that

A solution of the equation

is a function  such that:

the previous equality holds .
The Cauchy problem consists in finding a solution of the equation, satisfying the initial condition .

Well posedness
According to the definition of well-posed problem by Hadamard, the Cauchy problem is said to be well posed (or correct) on  if:
for any  it has a unique solution, and
this solution depends continuously on the initial data in the sense that if , then  for the corresponding solution at every 

Semigroup of operators associated to a Cauchy problem
To an abstract Cauchy problem one can associate a semigroup of operators , i.e. a family of bounded linear operators depending on a parameter  such that

Consider the operator  which assigns to the element  the value of the solution  of the Cauchy problem at the moment of time .

In this case one can associate to any  the function , for any . Such a function is called generalized solution of the Cauchy problem.

Conversely, if  is the infinitesimal generator of a C0-semigroup , then the Cauchy problem

is uniformly well posed and the solution is given by

Nonhomogeneous problem
The Cauchy problem

The following theorem gives some sufficient conditions for the existence of the solution:

Theorem.

is the unique solution to the (abstract) nonhomogeneous Cauchy problem.

The integral on the right-hand side as to be intended as a Bochner integral.

Time-dependent problem
The problem of finding a solution to the initial value problem

 and
.
 is also called evolution operator, propagator, solution operator or Green's function.

A function  is called a mild solution of the time-dependent problem if it admits the integral representation

There are various known sufficient conditions for the existence of the evolution operator . Roughly speaking, if  is the infinitesimal generator of a contraction semigroup the equation is said to be of hyperbolic type; if  is the infinitesimal generator of an analytic semigroup the equation is said to be of parabolic type.

Non linear problem
The problem of finding a solution to either

where  is given, or

where  is a nonlinear operator with domain , is called nonlinear Cauchy problem.

See also 
 Cauchy problem
 C0-semigroup

References 

Functional analysis